Reimo Sagor (born on 14 May 1987 in Lääne-Nigula Parish) is an Estonian actor.

In 2014 he graduated from Estonian Academy of Music and Theatre's Stage Art Department. Since 2014 he is working at Vanemuine theatre in Tartu. Intermittently, he has worked also at NO99 Theatre. Besides theatre roles he has played also in several films.

Filmography

 2014: Nullpunkt
 2015: Must alpinist
 2016: Päevad, mis ajasid segadusse
 2018: Võta või jäta
 2019: Skandinaavia vaikus
 2022: Tagurpidi torn 
 2022: Kalev

References

Living people
1987 births
Estonian male stage actors
Estonian male film actors
Estonian male television actors
21st-century Estonian male actors
Estonian Academy of Music and Theatre alumni
People from Lääne-Nigula Parish